Ibrahima Moctar Sarr (Serer: Ibrahema Muktar Saar; born 1949) is a Mauritanian journalist and politician of the Serer patrilineage Saar (or Sarr). Running as an independent, he placed fifth in the March 2007 presidential election, and he has been the President of the Alliance for Justice and Democracy/Movement for Renewal (AJD/MR) since August 2007.

After studying in Cesti, Senegal, Sarr trained as a teacher before working in insurance.  He became politically active in 1972, being a co-founder member of the Mauritanian Workers Party.  Increasingly active as a journalist, he appeared regularly on radio and television.  In 1983 he was a co-founder of the African Liberation Forces of Mauritania (FLAM; Force pour la Liberation Africaine de Mauritanie), and in 1986 he was a communication specialist with FLAM when they published the second edition of the Manifesto of the oppressed black Mauritanian.  Following this anti-racist publication, which highlighted racial practices by the Mauritanian Government, many black leaders were arrested and thrown to jail. Ibrahima Sarr was sentenced to four years in jail.

In 1989, after being released from jail, Sarr resigned from FLAM and ceased his political activities until the democratization process was started in 1992 by President Ould Taya. Sarr then joined the Popular Progressive Alliance (APP) under Messaoud Ould Boulkheir, becoming a leading member of the party. He later left the APP.

Sarr stood in the March 2007 presidential election on an anti-racist platform.  In order to facilitate his candidacy, he founded the "Movement for National Reconciliation", although he stood as an independent.  Claiming that "I am the candidate of the oppressed", he called for equal rights for Pulaar, Soninké and Wolof people alongside Moors, and the return of Mauritanian refugees from Senegal. Sarr came in fifth place with 7.95% of the vote in the election, and he backed Ahmed Ould Daddah for the second round.

Sarr's Movement for National Reconciliation subsequently merged with the Alliance for Justice and Democracy (AJD), and at an extraordinary congress to ratify the merger on August 18–19, Sarr was elected as the leader of the new party, the AJD/MR.

Sarr said on May 10, 2008 that the AJD/MR would not participate in the government of Prime Minister Yahya Ould Ahmed El Waghef due to policy differences.

Following the August 2008 military coup, Sarr and the AJD/MR expressed support for the military junta, and Sarr announced on April 11, 2009, that he would be a candidate in the controversial June 2009 presidential election, which was being organized by the junta and which opposition parties were planning to boycott. Sarr said that "the conditions are there for a free poll" and that Mauritania did not have democracy under Abdallahi's presidency. The Constitutional Court approved four candidacies, including Sarr's, on April 28.

References

"Ibrahima SARR, candidat indépendant : 'Ma candidature est celle des opprimés'", Walfadjri 
"Ibrahima Sarr, BBCAfrique.com

External links
 
Official Webpage of FLAM 

1949 births
Living people
Mauritanian journalists
Alliance for Justice and Democracy/Movement for Renewal politicians
Serer journalists
Serer politicians